The 2008 FIA WTCC Race of Brazil was the opening round of the 2008 World Touring Car Championship season and the third running of the FIA WTCC Race of Brazil. It took place on 2 March at the Autodromo Internacional de Curitiba in Pinhais, Brazil.

Both races were won by SEAT Sport with Yvan Muller winning race one and Gabriele Tarquini winning race two.

Background
Having run their diesel engine in three of their cars towards the end of 2007, SEAT Sport entered five cars powered by their TDI engine for 2008 as they looked to challenge BMW.

Report

Testing and free practice
Augusto Farfus was quickest in the Friday test session, Sergio Hernández in 14th was the best placed independent driver.

Fellow BMW driver Jörg Müller topped the first free practice session on Saturday morning which took place on a drying track.

SUNRED Engineering's Tom Coronel was quickest in the second practice session, just 0.002 seconds quicker than the BMW of Farfus.

Qualifying
Yvan Muller led a SEAT front row with Rickard Rydell second. Farfus was third for BMW having had two of his fast laps interrupted, the first when the red flags came out for Chevrolet's Alain Menu who crashed at the final corner and the second time when he had to avoid a spinning Jörg Müller. Tarquini had the engine in his car changed prior to qualifying and ended the session fourth fastest while Nicola Larini was the best of the Chevrolets in fifth. His teammate Robert Huff was caught out by the red flag and started eighth for race one. Jordi Gené was ninth having suffered brake problems and Coronel behind him was the best–placed petrol–powered SEAT. Exagon Engineering's Pierre-Yves Corthals was the independents' pole sitter in 15th.

Menu escaped without injury from accident but was transferred to hospital shortly after for precautionary scans. He was later cleared to race having qualified 11th.

Warm-Up
Farfus led a BMW 1–2–3 in the Sunday morning warm–up session, pole sitter Yvan Muller was ninth.

Race One
Yvan Muller held first place at the start ahead of Rydell, Tarquini ran first in the early stages of the race before being passed by Farfus. Farfus was closing in second–placed Rydell but was unable to make a move having had to defend from teammate Jörg Müller on the last lap. Andy Priaulx had started 12th and climbed up the order to finish 5th, passing Tarquini and Gené in the final laps. Yvan Muller and Rydell successfully converted their front row starts into a SEAT 1–2, Coronel finished eighth to take pole position for race two. Corthals was the victor in the independents' trophy.

Gené and Corthals were both later given 30–second penalties after the race for driving infringements, Corthals' penalty handed victory in the independents' trophy to Olivier Tielemans. It was also discovered that the BMW of Farfus did not comply with the technical regulations and he was excluded from the race.

Race Two
Coronel started on pole position, a bad start saw him drop well down the order. Porteiro assumed the lead which was then taken by Tarquini further around the first lap. On lap nine a charging Priaulx passed Félix Porteiro to take second place on lap nine and by the end of the race was on the tail of Tarquini. Tarquini finished first to take the second win of the weekend for SEAT, Priaulx was second and Porteiro third. Jörg Müller ended up fourth ahead of Yvan Muller after an intense battle between the pair. Coronel ended up outside the points in ninth. Tielemans was the independents' victor again.

Results

Qualifying

Race 1

Bold denotes Fastest lap.

Race 2

Bold denotes Fastest lap.

Standings after the event

Drivers' Championship standings

Yokohama Independents' Trophy standings

Manufacturers' Championship standings

 Note: Only the top five positions are included for both sets of drivers' standings.

References

External links
World Touring Car Championship official website

Brazil
FIA WTCC Race of Brazil